Gaines is an unincorporated community in Upshur County, West Virginia, United States.

The community was named in honor of U.S. Representative Joseph H. Gaines.

References 

Unincorporated communities in West Virginia
Unincorporated communities in Upshur County, West Virginia